Wadena may refer to:

People
Chip Wadena. American, Ojibwe tribal executive

Locations
United States
Wadena, Indiana
Wadena, Iowa
Wadena, Minnesota
Wadena Township, Minnesota

Canada
Wadena, Saskatchewan
Wadena (electoral district), a former provincial electoral district in Saskatchewan

Other uses
, a steam yacht that served in the U.S. Navy in World War I